Régine Cavagnoud (27 June 1970 – 31 October 2001) was a World Cup alpine ski racer from France. She was the World Cup and World Champion in Super-G in 2001. Later that year, Cavagnoud was involved in a high-speed collision while training and died two days later. She competed at three Winter Olympics and five world championships.

Career
Born in Thônes, Haute-Savoie, Cavagnoud's career was plagued by injuries.  She finally secured a World Cup race victory in her tenth year of competition, a downhill at Cortina d'Ampezzo, Italy, in January 1999.  That was the first World Cup downhill race victory by a Frenchwoman in 17 years. Cavagnoud had eight World Cup victories: four in Super-G, three in downhill, and two in giant slalom. Her last victory was in March 2001 in giant slalom at the national championships in Courchevel, France. She topped the Super-G season standings in 2001 and was ranked third overall in 2000 and 2001. At the 2001 World Championships in St. Anton, Austria, she won the Super-G title on 29 January.

Death
On 29 October 2001, Cavagnoud collided with German ski coach Markus Anwander during ski training in Pitztal, Austria, as he crossed the piste. Both sustained serious head injuries and were evacuated by helicopter to Innsbruck's university hospital, where Cavagnoud was found to have serious brain damage and succumbed to her injuries two days later. 

Her death was the first fatality involving a World Cup ski racer in over seven years, since the death of Austria's Ulrike Maier in a downhill race in January 1994.

Cavagnoud was buried near her native village at La Clusaz in the French Alps.

World Cup results

Season titles

Season standings

Race victories
8 wins – (3 DH, 4 SG, 1 GS)
23 podiums – (8 DH, 12 SG, 3 GS)

World Championship results

Olympic results

References

External links
 
 Régine Cavagnoud World Cup standings at the International Ski Federation 
 
 BBC News

1970 births
2001 deaths
Sportspeople from Haute-Savoie
French female alpine skiers
Skiing deaths
Sport deaths in Austria
FIS Alpine Ski World Cup champions
Olympic alpine skiers of France
Alpine skiers at the 1992 Winter Olympics
Alpine skiers at the 1994 Winter Olympics
Alpine skiers at the 1998 Winter Olympics
20th-century French women